Witty is an unincorporated community in Douglas County, in the Ozarks of southern Missouri.

History
A post office called Witty was established in 1892, and remained in operation until 1926. An early postmaster named Witty gave the community his name.

References

Unincorporated communities in Douglas County, Missouri
Unincorporated communities in Missouri